Dalia Stasevska (born 30 December 1984) is a Finnish conductor. She is currently the principal guest conductor of the BBC Symphony Orchestra, and chief conductor of the Lahti Symphony Orchestra.

Biography
Born in Kyiv, Ukrainian SSR, Soviet Union, Stasevska and her family subsequently moved to Tallinn, and later to Finland when she was five.  Her family lived in Helsinki for a year, and then moved to Tampere in southwest Finland. As a youth, Stasevska learnt the violin.  She formally studied violin and composition at the Tampere Conservatory.  She continued her musical studies in violin and viola at the Sibelius Academy, Helsinki.  In her 20s, she developed a new interest in conducting, and pawned her violin to finance education in conducting.  Stasevska studied conducting at the Royal Swedish Academy of Music, where her teachers included Jorma Panula, and at the Sibelius Academy, where her teachers included Leif Segerstam.  She earned a diploma from the Sibelius Academy in 2012.

From 2010 to 2015, Stasevska was artistic director of the Kamarikesä Festival.  From 2014 to 2016, Stasevska was an assistant conductor to Paavo Järvi at the Orchestre de Paris.  In 2015, Stasevska first guest-conducted the Lahti Symphony Orchestra (Sinfonia Lahti).  On 10 December 2018, she conducted the Royal Stockholm Philharmonic Orchestra at the Nobel Prize Award Ceremony 2018, the second female conductor ever to conduct the orchestra at the Prize Award Ceremony.

Stasevska made her UK guest-conducting debut in 2018 with the orchestra of Opera North.  In May 2018, Stasevska first guest-conducted the BBC Symphony Orchestra (BBC SO) at a Maida Vale studio concert.  On the basis of this appearance, in January 2019, the BBC SO announced the appointment of Stasevska as its next principal guest conductor, effective July 2019.  Stasevska is the first female conductor ever to be named principal guest conductor of the BBC SO, and the second female conductor to have a titled post with a BBC orchestra.  She made her public debut with the BBC SO at The Proms in July 2019. She conducted the Last Night of The Proms in September 2020, under social distancing conditions and without an audience in the wake of the COVID-19 pandemic, the second female conductor to conduct the Last Night and the third Last Night to feature a female conductor.  In July 2021, she conducted the First Night of The Proms, the second female conductor ever to conduct the First Night. She was scheduled for the Last Night 2022 but 48 hours prior, it was cancelled due to the death of Elizabeth II.

In May 2020, Sinfonia Lahti announced the appointment of Stasevska as its next chief conductor, effective from the 2021–2022 season, with an initial contract of three seasons, and making her the first female conductor to be named chief conductor of the Lahti Symphony Orchestra. This appointment marks her first chief conductor post.

Stasevska is married to the Finnish musician and composer Lauri Porra, the bassist for Stratovarius and the great-grandson of Jean Sibelius.  In November 2020, the Royal Philharmonic Society announced Stasevska as the recipient of its 2020 Conductor Award.

References

External links
 Official webpage of Dalia Stasevska
 Harrison Parrott agency page on Dalia Stasevska
 'My First Concert: Dalia Stasevska'.  Opera North blog, 5 March 2019

 

1984 births
Living people
Finnish conductors (music)
Women conductors (music)
Finnish women musicians
21st-century Finnish musicians
21st-century women musicians
21st-century conductors (music)
Ukrainian emigrants to Finland
Musicians from Kyiv
musicians from Tampere
Sibelius Academy alumni
Finnish people of Ukrainian descent
Ukrainian emigrants